The Asian Youth Games, also known as AYG, is a multi-sport event held every four years among athletes from all over Asia. The Games have been organized by the Olympic Council of Asia (OCA). The Games are described as the second largest multi-sport event after the Asian Games.

The creation of the AYG is part of Singapore's bid to host the 2010 Summer Youth Olympics. It was intended to show Singapore's organisational capabilities and infrastructure.

In its history, two nations have hosted the Asian Youth Games. Forty-five nations have participated in the Games.

The last Games was held in Nanjing, China from 16 to 24 August 2013 and the next games will be held in Tashkent, Uzbekistan in 2025.

List of Asian Youth Games

Sports
Officially, there were a total of 19 sports, which were held till date in the Asian Youth Games.

Medal count

References

 
Recurring sporting events established in 2009
Asian international sports competitions
Multi-sport events in Asia
Olympic Council of Asia
Youth multi-sport events